Ending on a High Note may refer to:

 Ending on a High Note Tour, a worldwide concert tour by a-ha
 Ending on a High Note, an episode of the TV series Fame